Yangitau (Yañıtaw) is a rural locality (a khutor) in Burnovsky Selsoviet, Birsky District, Bashkortostan, Russia. The population was 12 as of 2010. There are 2 streets.

Geography 
Yangitau is located 10 km north of Birsk (the district's administrative centre) by road. Bazhenovo is the nearest rural locality.

References 

Rural localities in Birsky District